The State Anthem of the Republic of Dagestan, also known as "The Oath", is the regional anthem of Dagestan, a federal subject of Russia. It was adopted on 25 February 2016. The music was composed by Murad Kajlayev, and the lyrics are based on an Avar poem by Rasul Gamzatov. The official Russian lyrics were written by Nikolay Dorizo. It replaced "Dagestan, you holy fatherland", a musical work that functioned as the state anthem from 2003 to 2016.

Lyrics

Notes

References

Regional songs
Culture of Dagestan
Degestan
Dagestan